Dean Sampson (born 27 June 1967) is an English former professional rugby league footballer who played as a , and spent the majority of his professional career at the Castleford Tigers (Heritage № 661), with spells in Australia for Gold Coast and the Parramatta Eels (Heritage № 551). Sampson made over 400 appearances for Castleford (Tigers) between 1987 and 2005. He also represented England and Great Britain at international level, and was selected to go on the 1992 Great Britain Lions tour of Australia and New Zealand.

Background
Sampson was born in Wakefield, West Riding of Yorkshire, England.

Playing career
Sampson started his career at Stanley Rangers before joining Castleford in 1986, and made his first team début in 1987.

International honours
Sampson played right- in Great Britain's 14–8 victory over Auckland on the 1992 Great Britain Lions tour of Australasia at Carlaw Park, Parnell, New Zealand on Wednesday 8 July 1992, and played left- in Great Britain's 17–6 victory over Canterbury on the 1992 Great Britain Lions tour of Australasia at Rugby League Park/Addington Showgrounds, Christchurch on Wednesday 15 July 1992.

In the 1997 post season, Sampson was selected to play for Great Britain in the first match of the Super League Test series against Australia.

Sampson won caps for England while at Castleford in the 1995 Rugby League World Cup against Fiji, South Africa (interchange/substitute), and Wales (interchange/substitute), and in 1999 against France (two occasions).

Challenge Cup Final appearances
Sampson was an interchange/substitute, i.e. number 15, (replacing Left- Lee Crooks on 33-minutes) in Castleford's 12–28 defeat by Wigan in the 1992 Challenge Cup Final during the 1991–92 season at Wembley Stadium, London on Saturday 2 May 1992, in front of a crowd of 77,386.

County Cup Final appearances
Sampson played as an interchange/substitute, i.e. number 15, (replacing  Kevin Beardmore) in Castleford's 12–12 draw with Bradford Northern in the 1987 Yorkshire Cup Final during the 1987–88 season at Headingley, Leeds on Saturday 17 October 1987, played as an interchange/substitute, i.e. number 15, (replacing  John Fifita) in the 2–11 defeat by Bradford Northern in the 1987 Yorkshire Cup Final replay during the 1987–88 season at Elland Road, Leeds on Saturday 31 October 1987, played as an interchange/substitute, i.e. number 15, (replacing interchange/substitute David Roockley) in the 12–33 defeat by Leeds in the 1988 Yorkshire Cup Final during the 1988–89 season at Elland Road, Leeds on Sunday 16 October 1988, and played  in the 11–8 victory over Wakefield Trinity in the 1990 Yorkshire Cup Final during the 1990–91 season at Elland Road, Leeds on Sunday 23 September 1990.

Regal Trophy Final appearances
Sampson played as an interchange/substitute, i.e. number 15, (replacing  Martin Ketteridge on 74-minutes) in Castleford's 33–2 victory over Wigan in the 1993–94 Regal Trophy Final during the 1993–94 season at Headingley, Leeds on Saturday 22 January 1994.

Club career
Sampson came back in 2003 when Castleford Tigers went through an injury crisis, scoring on his comeback game against Warrington Wolves. He also played once more for Castleford Tigers in 2005 against Hull Dockers in the Challenge Cup. Overall Sampson played 431 games for Castleford scoring 68 tries. With 431-appearances, Sampson is joint second (along with Artie Atkinson) in Castleford's all-time appearance list behind John Joyner, who has 613-appearances. Sampson was a real fans favourite for Castleford and his name was often chanted by the home fans.

Coaching career
After retirement, Sampson became the club's academy coach and won the Junior academy championship in 2004. He left the club in 2005 and moved to Hull Kingston Rovers, and became the assistant coach there. Sampson left Hull Kingston Rovers after a brief period and stayed out of the game for a while.

Sampson rejoined Castleford for 2009's Super League XIV, and was the club's academy coach once again.

Honoured at Castleford Tigers
Sampson is a Tigers Hall of Fame Inductee.

Genealogical information
Sampson is the son of the rugby league footballer, and coach; Dave Sampson and Mavis (née Dean), the nephew of the rugby league footballer; Malcolm Sampson, and the cousin of the sprinter; Denise Ramsden, and the rugby union, and rugby league footballer; Paul Sampson.

References

External links
(archived by web.archive.org) World Cup 1995 details

(archived by web.archive.org) England battle to French wins

1967 births
Living people
Castleford Tigers players
England national rugby league team players
English rugby league coaches
English rugby league players
Gold Coast Chargers players
Great Britain national rugby league team players
Parramatta Eels players
Rugby league players from Wakefield
Rugby league props